Blood River is a river in South Africa.

Blood River may also refer to:
 Blood River (2009 film), a psychological thriller film 
 Blood River (1991 film), an American TV film
 Battle of Blood River, a battle on the bank of the river in 1838
 Blood River: A Journey to Africa's Broken Heart, a 2007 book by Tim Butcher